The Men's slalom competition of the Calgary 1988 Olympics was held at Nakiska.

The defending world champion was Frank Wörndl of West Germany, while Yugoslavia's Bojan Križaj was the defending World Cup slalom champion and Alberto Tomba the leader of the 1988 World Cup.

Results

References 

Men's slalom
Winter Olympics